Eiríkr I may refer to:

Erik Björnsson, Eric I of Sweden (early 9th century)
Eric I of Norway, known as Eric Bloodaxe (died in 954)
Eric I of Denmark (c. 1060–1103)